McGonagle (also McGonigle, McGonagall, McGonigal, McGonegal, or McGonnigal) is a surname. The name and its variants derive from the Irish name Mac Congail. 

Notable people with the surname include:

Allan McGonigal (born 1964), Scottish footballer
Ambrose McGonigal (1917–1979), British Army soldier and judge
Brendan McGonigle (1939–2007), reader in psychology at the University of Edinburgh in Scotland
Bruce McGonnigal (born 1968), American football player
Charles McGonigal (born 1968/1969), American former FBI official
David McGonigal (born 1950), Australian writer and photographer
Declan McGonagle (born 1953), Irish art curator and professor of art at University of Ulster
Elvis McGonagall (born 1960), Scottish poet and stand-up comedian
Geoffrey McGonagle (born 1974), Irish dual GAA player who played Gaelic football and hurling for Derry
George M'Gonigle (1889–1939), Medical Officer for Health in Stockton-on-Tees from 1924 to 1939
Jamie McGonnigal (born 1975), American actor
Jane McGonigal (born 1977), American video game designer
Jerry McGonigle (born 1958/59), associate professor of acting and directing at West Virginia University in Morgantown, West Virginia
Kelly McGonigal (born 1977), American health psychologist
Paul McGonagle (1939–1974), mobster, leader of the Mullen Gang involved in burglary and armed robbery in Boston, Massachusetts
Paul McGonigle (born 1970s), Irish Gaelic footballer
Pearl McGonigal (born 1929), Canadian politician
Peter McGonagle (1904–1956), Scottish footballer who played mainly for Celtic
Richard McGonagle (born 1946), American actor
Stephen McGonagle (1914–2002), Irish trade unionist
William McGonagall (1825–1902), Scottish poet
William McGonagle (1925–1999), United States Naval officer who received the Medal of Honor

Other uses

Fictional characters
"The Great McGonigle," W. C. Fields' character in the film The Old Fashioned Way
Minerva McGonagall, a character in the Harry Potter series

Places
McGonigle Hall, athletic facility on the campus of Temple University in Philadelphia, Pennsylvania
McGonigle, Ohio, unincorporated community in northwestern Hanover Township, Butler County, Ohio
McGonagle Site, RI-1227, historic site in Scituate, Rhode Island

References

